DWCD 97.9 was an FM station owned and operated by Crusaders Broadcasting System. Its radio transmitter and studios were located at Shaw Boulevard, Mandaluyong from 1986 to 1995 and on 209 E. Dela Paz, Mandaluyong since 1995.

History
After the launch of DWAD in July 1973, 97.9 Crusaders FM made its inaugural broadcast in April 1986, and it played pop, mellow, OPM and Christian music. It had temporary permits in January 1994 and then in May 1996.

In May 1997, the station ceased operations because the Broadcast Service Division of the NTC recommended the cancellation and revocation of the permit of Crusaders due to a case filed by ConAmor Broadcasting Systems (now DCG Radio-TV Network). In August 1997, 97.9 FM was acquired by Aliw Broadcasting Corporation and began test broadcasts in mid-1998 under the callsign DWQZ.

In September 1997, there was a trial court. The commission believes and so holds that respondent's request for renewal of its temporary permit to operate 97.9 Crusaders FM should be, as it is, hereby DENIED. Therefore, 97.9 Crusaders FM has withdrawn and inactive until today. On the other hand, Aliw Broadcasting Corporation began operations of 97.9 Home Radio (now 979 Home Radio) since mid-1998 as a Test Broadcast, and continues to operate on this frequency up to this day.

See also
 DWAD
 Aliw Broadcasting Corporation
 979 Home Radio Manila

References

Defunct radio stations in Metro Manila
Radio stations established in 1986
1986 in the Philippines